Enuff Z'nuff is an American hard rock band from Blue Island, Illinois. Formed in 1984 with the spelling "Enough Z' nuff", the group originally included lead vocalist, rhythm guitarist, and keyboardist Donnie Vie (real name Donald Vandevelde), bassist, rhythm guitarist, and backing vocalist Chip Z'nuff (real name Gregory Rybarski), lead guitarist Gino Martino and drummer B.W. Boeski. The group released its first demo, Hollywood Squares, in 1985. Martino left in 1987 and was briefly replaced by Pete Comita and later Alex Kane. By 1988, Kane and Boeski had been replaced by Derek Frigo and Vik "Vikki" Foxx, respectively. The band adopted the spelling "Enuff Z'nuff" and released its self-titled debut album in 1989. Strength and Animals with Human Intelligence followed in 1991 and 1993.

Shortly after recording was completed for Animals with Human Intelligence, Foxx left Enuff Z'nuff. and was replaced by Ricky Parent. After a disheartening performance at The Roxy Theatre in West Hollywood, Ca., the group was dropped by Arista Records and Derek Frigo also left the band. 1985 was released in 1994, featuring recordings from the band's original lineup. Original lead guitarist Gino Martino returned for 1995's Tweaked, before leaving again shortly after its release, leaving Vie, Z'nuff and Parent to record 1996's Peach Fuzz as a three-piece. Shortly after the album's release, Johnny Monaco joined Enuff Z'nuff in 1996 as the band's new lead guitarist. He also took over lead vocal duties when Vie left in 2002. The "classic lineup" of the band reunited to record ? in 2004. A full reunion was rumored, however Derek Frigo died on May 28 that year.

Later in 2004, Parent became unable to perform when he was diagnosed with cancer. He was initially replaced by Randi Scott, and later by Erik Donner, who remained until spring 2006. Chad Stewart and Greg Potter later filled in as temporary members, before Scott returned to the band. Parent later died as a result of his condition in October 2007. Johnny Monaco left the band as Vie returned in 2008, bringing new guitarist C.J. Szuter from his short-lived project, L.A. Smogg, for a few shows. Shortly after, Szuter was replaced by Tory Stoffregen. By May 2013, Vie again left the band with Johnny Monaco returning as the group's frontman. A year later, both Stoffregen and Scott left Enuff Z'nuff on "amicable terms", with Johnny Monaco and Z'nuff opting to continue as a three-piece with returning drummer Erik Donner.

Johnny Monaco left the band for a second time in January 2016 while Z'nuff signed a new recording contract without informing him. Z'nuff subsequently took over lead vocal duties, and the band released Clowns Lounge later in the year with returning members Stoffregen and Donner, plus new rhythm guitarist Tony Fenelle. By October, Donner had left again with Daniel Hill taking his place. The new lineup released its first album Diamond Boy in August 2018. In March 2019, Tony Fenelle quit the band and was replaced by former member Alex Kane.

Members

Current

Former

Touring

Timeline

Lineups

References

External links
Enuff Z'nuff official website

Enuff Z'nuff